Karol Kučera was the defending champion but lost to Àlex Corretja in the semifinals.

Todd Martin won the title, defeating Corretja 6–3, 7–6(7–5) in the final.

Seeds

  Àlex Corretja (final)
  Patrick Rafter (first round)
  Carlos Moyá (second round)
  Karol Kučera (semifinals)
  Greg Rusedski (first round)
  Richard Krajicek (second round)
  Albert Costa (quarterfinals)
  Todd Martin (champion)

Draw

Finals

Top half

Bottom half

References

 Main Draw

 
syd
Singles